Servant of the People is a liberal, centrist, pro-European political party in Ukraine.

It was formed in late 2017 and was officially registered on 31 March 2018 on the basis of the previously registered Party of Decisive Changes. The party is named after the Ukrainian TV series Servant of the People. In the 2019 parliamentary election the party won 124 seats on the nationwide party list and 130 constituency seats. The current president of Ukraine Volodymyr Zelenskyy (who starred in Servant of the People) is a member of the party.

History

Founding
Legally, the party is the successor of the Party of Decisive Change that existed since April 2016 and was founded by Eugene Yurdiga.

The party was renamed in December 2017 after the eponymous Ukrainian hit TV series Servant of the People that starred Volodymyr Zelenskyy and was made by his TV production company Kvartal 95. The rebranded/renamed party's first leader was the CEO of Kvartal 95 Ivan Bakanov. At the time Kvartal 95 created the party, they claimed it was important to do so to prevent others from stealing the name of the eponymous series for "cynical political purposes". According to Zelenskyy in the summer of 2017 "some rogues" had almost registered a party called "Servant of the People" and that because of this Kvartal 95 had registered their Servant of the People party so voters would not be misled to think they would vote for a party that was not related to the TV series of the same name. Early 2018 Zelenskyy stated that the party was "not yet a political project", and said about its future: "Let's see".

In December 2017 4% of Ukrainians polled by the Ilko Kucheriv Democratic Initiatives Foundation and the Razumkov Center declared their readiness to vote for a party named "Servant of the People" in parliamentary elections, and in May 2018 this number had grown to 5% (the minimum necessary to pass Ukraine's election threshold). When democracy watchdog Chesno tried to contact Zelenskyy and party representatives in September 2018 in an attempt to ask if the party would take part in elections a spokeswoman for Kvartal 95 responded "Unfortunately, party representatives are unable to comment on your request. There is currently no information that might be of interest to you." The press service of Kvartal 95 could (also) not provide Chesno a picture of party leader Bakanov. Chesno was able to find out that the leadership of the party only consisted of people related to Kvartal-95.

Billboards advertising "Servants of the People" appeared on the streets of Ukrainian cities in November 2018. Zelenskyy later admitted that these billboards were legally only advertising the third season of the TV series "Servant of the People" but were also part of his election campaign so his campaign could "save a lot of money." The party's first financiers were either NGO's that did not have to report the origins of their donations or companies that all changed their addresses in the same week, this led Chesno to believe these companies were interconnected. Almost all of the 2018 funds were received on the eve of Zelenskyy's 2019 New Year's speech in which he announced his candidacy in the 2019 Ukrainian presidential election.

Party winning the 2019 presidential and parliamentary election

In late December 2018 Zelenskyy was declared a presidential candidate from the party at the 2019 presidential election. While lagging behind in January 2019, Zelenskyy began to lead the polls by March. He would go on to win the first round of the presidential elections, taking first place and moving on to the run off against incumbent President Poroshenko on 21 April 2019, winning the election with over 73% of the votes cast. Zelenskyy stated that the party would enter a coalition government with neither the Petro Poroshenko Bloc nor Opposition Platform — For Life.

In his inauguration speech to parliament on 20 May 2019 President Zelenskyy dissolved parliament and decreed an early election to be held on 21 July 2019. On 27 May 2019 Dmytro Razumkov was appointed as party chairman in place of Ivan Bakanov. Oleksandr Kornienko had been made head of the party's election headquarters, and Mykhailo Fedorov was installed as the party's chief of digital strategies. On 2 June 2019, the registration of potential candidates to run for the party in majority constituencies during the 2019 Ukrainian parliamentary election ended. Party leader Razumkov assured on 7 June 2019 that no incumbent MPs would be on the party list for the 2019 parliamentary election, but that the election list would consist of "new ambitious politicians."

The party held its first congress on 9 June 2019. It took place in Kyiv's Hryshko National Botanical Garden and was attended by President Zelenskyy and party leader Razumkov, among others. During the congress the first names of the party's majority constituency candidates and the 97 candidates of the nationwide closed party list were made public. Well-known names in the nationwide party list were: Olympic athletes Olha Saladukha, Vadym Gutzeit and Zhan Beleniuk and long-term CEO of 1+1 Media Group Oleksandr Tkachenko. Three days later Gutzeit and two other candidates had withdrawn themselves from the election, whilst a fourth was excluded from the list "after additional checks". During the post-primaries, press and activists highlighted the most controversial representatives of the party, such as Oleksandr Dubinsky and Max Buzhanskiy. Neither of them was withdrawn from the final list of the party after the registration deadlines. The party excluded seven candidates from its list on 7 July 2019; five candidates were removed “as a result of information submitted [to the party] via the website and chat bot”, whilst two others requested to be removed from the list, including the No. 31 candidate. On 19 July 2019, the leader of the Movement of New Forces party Mikheil Saakashvili called on his supporters to vote for the Servant of the People party at the parliamentary election.

In the (21 July) 2019 parliamentary election the top ten party candidates were Dmytro Razumkov, Ruslan Stefanchuk, Iryna Venediktova, Davyd Arakhamia, Halyna Yanchenko, Mykhailo Fedorov, Oleksandr Kornienko, Anastasia Krasnosilska, Oleksandr Tkachenko and Zhan Beleniuk. In the election the party won 124 seats on the nationwide party list (43.16% of the votes) and 130 constituency seats. Several members of the political  party UKROP (a party that has openly been supported by Ukrainian oligarch Ihor Kolomoyskyi) won constituency seats as candidates for Servant of the People (the two parties had no formal allegiance). In parliament Davyd Arakhamia became the party's faction leader.

Party since winning the 2019 parliamentary election
On 11 November 2019 Oleksandr Kornienko replaced Razumkov as party chairman.

The party won about 25% of the votes in December 2019 local United territorial community elections (non-aligned candidates gained 44% of the votes).

In June 2020 the party started to create its local organisation by appointing "Cell leaders". In May 2020 the party had no official registered local branch.

In the 2020 Ukrainian local elections the party won more seats than the other parties participating, 17.59% of local seats were won by the party. In total, the party nominated more than 23,000 candidates for local councils. Observers pointed out that the party (as other national parties) did suffer setbacks in Ukraine's largest cities across the country, including the capital Kyiv. In Kyiv, the party's mayoral candidate Iryna Vereshchuk and the party itself finished in fifth place.  This was despite the fact that in the 2019 parliamentary election Servant of the People was the most popular party among Kyivites with 36.46%. 225 Servant of the People candidates (30.74% of all elected mayors nominated by a political party) were elected village, town or city mayors. Independent candidates won 661 mayoral elections. Although the party had not allowed incumbent MPs but only "new ambitious politicians" to be their candidate in the 2019 parliamentary election, in the 2020 Ukrainian local elections Servant of the People candidates were incumbent mayors and local council members and (other) former members of Party of Regions, Batkivshchyna, Petro Poroshenko Bloc and other political parties. In elections held in places with a population of less than 10,000 voters, the party won two seats.

In the spring of 2021 the party created a youth wing called "Ze! Molodizhka" ("Ze! Youth").

The party did not nominate a candidate for the October 2021 snap mayoral election in Kharkiv (the second-largest city of Ukraine).

According to Ukrayinska Pravda in December 2021 the party de facto had no majority in parliament anymore since it could only rely on 210 of its deputies during important votes, while any bill required 226 votes to pass. Since 2019, nine deputies had been expelled from the faction and Dmytro Razumkov did not return to the faction after his removal from post as Chairman of parliament on 7 October 2021. (Razumkov was replaced by Servant of the People member Ruslan Stefanchuk.)

On 28 February 2022, the party was granted affiliate status by the Alliance of Liberals and Democrats for Europe Party.

Ideology and position 
It is positioned in the centre on the political spectrum, while its political ideology has been described as populist and liberal.

On 23 May 2019, Ruslan Stefanchuk, Zelenskyy's representative in the Verkhovna Rada, announced that the party had chosen libertarianism as its core ideology. On 3 June 2019, however, the head of the party's election office Oleksandr Kornienko claimed, "go 20km or 100km out of Kyiv, and nobody will understand the issue of ideology there, who is right, left or centre here. The party will have its manifesto on its website, it will explain everything." After Kornienko was elected as head the party in early November 2019, he stated that the then party ideology of "libertarianism" would be changed, which was "needed to find a compromise within the party." He claimed that the new party ideology "will be something between liberal and socialist views." At the February 2020 Party Congress, Kornienko stated that the party's ideology is "Ukrainian centrism." According to him, this is an ideology that "denies political extremes and radicalism. But it is creative centrism."

In the election program for the 2019 parliamentary election, the party stated, "we will introduce the most favored regime for foreign investors of Ukrainian origin". It also promised to introduce "a mechanism for withdrawing deputies who have lost the confidence of the voters". The program also puts forward a number of direct democracy and anti-corruption proposals. The party has also vowed to expand Ukraine's cooperation with the European Union and NATO. The party also claimed that its key goal is to achieve a higher than average European income and quality of life for Ukrainians.

In early July 2019, Ruslan Stefanchuk, number 2 in the party's election list, expressed his belief that Ukrainian language should be promoted (in a process of the so-called "Ukrainization") but only "quite mildly" and that "one needs to fight for the language to provide quality." "Neither by bans, nor by persecution, but only by equality. When Ukrainian language content becomes more interesting and higher quality, then we will absolutely have another attitude. Meanwhile, the state should work out all mechanisms for that," he said.

Electoral performance

Verkhovna Rada

Presidential elections

Criticism 

In March 2019, Ukrainian writer and intellectual Yurii Andrukhovych believed that Volodymyr Zelenskyy's team was a light version of the Party of Regions.

In December 2018, political commentator Mykhailo Basarab wrote on Den that Zelenskyy would "bring the most trouble to pro-Russian politicians and populists" because "he is their closest competitor" and will attract "part of the pro-Russian and demagogic voters."

Notes

References

External links
Official website 
Taras Klochko. Servant of the People. How Stalin helps Zelenskyy to take over the power (Слуга народа. Как Сталин помогает Зеленскому брать власть). Delovaya Stolitsa. 13 July 2019.
David Kohan. The picture "Stalin – Servant of the People" appeared to be a fake (Картинка "Сталин - слуга народа" оказалась фейком). Fakeoff. 20 July 2019.

2018 establishments in Ukraine
Alliance of Liberals and Democrats for Europe Party member parties
Anti-corruption parties in Ukraine
Centrist parties in Ukraine
Direct democracy parties
Liberal parties in Ukraine
Parliamentary factions in Ukraine
Political parties established in 2018
Political parties in Ukraine
Populist parties
Pro-European political parties in Ukraine
Volodymyr Zelenskyy